Severe storm events in Sydney, New South Wales, Australia are not uncommon and include hailstorms, wind storms, and flash flooding from rain caused by East coast lows (common during autumn–winter periods), black nor'easters and/or tropical cyclone remnants (during summer periods). East coast lows are low pressure depressions or extratropical cyclones that can bring significant damage by heavy rain, cyclonic winds and huge swells. Sydney is rarely affected by cyclones, although remnants of cyclones do affect the city.

Scientists have predicted that rainfall in Sydney, with its moderate to low variability, will become more unpredictable and temperatures will be on the rise. According to CSIRO and the Bureau of Meteorology, global warming has increased the chances of extreme rain and flash floods recently, although destructive heavy rainfall events have occurred in Australia, including the Sydney area, since records began in the 18th century, and ergo the chronological list below will showcase the notable storm events from the earliest recorded date until present. Such severe storms are more prevalent during La Niña events as the El Niño–Southern Oscillation greatly effects Australia.

Notable events

18th–19th century
On 6 February 1788, Lieutenant Ralph Clark, an officer of the First Fleet, noted that he experienced "the most violent storm of lightning and rain", where he concludes, "The lightning was incessant during the whole night and I never heard it rain faster.”
The first recorded tornado in Australia struck Sydney in 1795, during the early settlement, where it destroyed crops and trees. 
On 20 August 1857, the Dunbar, a sailing ship carrying 122 people from England, was wrecked off South Head due to a powerful east coast low while trying to seek shelter in Sydney Harbour, leaving only one survivor.
Both in June 1816 and June 1864, the Hawkesbury River had overflowed after heavy rainfall, rising over 14 meters, where it flooded, and caused widespread damage in, nearby towns.
On 22 June 1867, heavy rain and winds caused the water of the Hawkesbury River to rise to 19.2 metres, submerging and ruining 16,000 homes and buildings from Pitt Town to Wisemans Ferry. The flood caused 12 deaths, which were dramatically represented in the Illustrated Sydney News in July 1867. Survivors were on rooftops waiting to be rescued by boatmen. Known as The Great Flood, it caused damage in the order of $1.4 billion in the Nepean region and it has about a one-in-280 chance of occurring again.
On 28 May 1889, the low-lying inner western suburbs of Croydon Park, Canterbury and Marrickville were heavily affected by torrential rainfall. Residents were depicted in newspapers in their rowboats rescuing the homeless and rowing through the flooded streets besides partially sunken shopfronts and homes. Some suburbs, such as Prospect in the greater west, received  of rainfall in 24 hours.

20th century

1910s–1930s

On 26 November 1912, a powerful hail and thunderstorm passed over Sydney, where  of rain fell in 10 minutes flooding streets, in addition to a lightning killing one labourer at a tramway construction site.
On 24 March 1914, Parramatta was flooded after  of rain fell in just two hours. Parramatta railway station, businesses in Church Street and houses were partially submerged, and the Parramatta River was overflowed.
On 25 November 1914, a severe thunderstorm which was likely accompanying a tornado, hit Sydney's northern and harbour-side suburbs, and destructed through a line of shopfronts near Lindfield railway station.
On 6 October 1916, an east coast low brought  of rain in 24 hours, flooding roads, overflowing rivers and damaging vegetable gardens.
On 25 October 1919, a powerful hailstorm caused severe damage to buildings when it blocked gutters and drains, thus allowing rainwater to overspill into ceilings and basements.
On 6 July 1931, Sydney was whipped by cyclonic winds and heavy rainfall, where it received  of rain in 24 hours. In addition to thousands of pounds worth of damage to property, which included roofs and electricity, five deaths were recorded. 
On 25 January 1937, a tornado tore through the suburbs of Marrickville, Mascot, Botany and Matraville, where five people died and dozens were injured in falling buildings.

1940s–1960s

On 31 October 1940, a tornado created a  path of damage, where it tore through thousands of homes, killing two people. A gust of 153 km/h was recorded.
In the 1947 Sydney hailstorm, which occurred on 1 January 1947, a storm cell developed on the morning of New Year's Day, over the Blue Mountains, hitting the city and dissipating east of Bondi in the mid-afternoon. At the time, it was the most severe storm to strike the city since recorded observations began in 1792. The high humidity, temperatures and weather patterns of Sydney increased the strength of the storm. The cost of damages from the storm were, at the time, approximately GB£750,000 (US$3 million); this is the equivalent of around A$45 million in modern figures.
On 15 June 1949,  of rain fell in just one hour, the highest at that time since the records began. Flash flooding swamped businesses, shopfronts and homes.
In June 1950, a series of east coast cyclones develop off the New South Wales coast during which Sydney registered its highest monthly rainfall on record, . 
On 26 July 1952, Sydney CBD received  of rain and cyclonic winds caused local floods, two landslides in the north, traffic delays and as well as a death of a man.
On 10 February 1956, heavy rain caused the Georges River to overflow, which led to five deaths, flooding 1,000 homes and leading to the evacuation of 8,000 people. Homes in Bankstown, Panania, East Hills, Milperra, Moorebank and the surrounds were submerged. Stranded residents were rescued by the police, the army and by civilians in row boats.
On 9 July 1957, a tornado squall occurred at Warriewood and Narrabeen in the Northern Beaches that blew off house roofs and caused more than £40,000 ($80,000) worth of damage.
On 23 November 1961, Penrith was flooded, with many properties and businesses being destroyed, after receiving half its annual average rainfall in just two days. The Nepean River reached a height of  after the area received  of rain in two days.

1970s–1990s
On 10 March 1975, Sydney airport received  of rainfall in six hours, in addition to flash flooding which caused more than $15 m worth of damage.
On 10 November 1976, intense thunderstorms caused severe damage in around Lidcombe and Auburn, with tennis-ball size (6 cm) hail and violent winds that injured 10 people. Damage costs were $40 million.
On 10–11 February 1978, a tornado tore through many homes in the Lower North Shore, injuring eight people. The damage cost was $15 million.
Between 19 and 24 March 1978, after an intense low pressure cell developed on the Coral Sea, travelling southwards, heavy rainfall occurred in the east coast which overflowed the Hawkesbury River, thereby flooding nearby homes and damaging roads.
On 8 November 1984, Sydney CBD saw  of rain with  falling at Observatory Hill in just one hour. Causing damage to homes in the Sydney Harbour and burying vehicles in mud, the storm was caused by a coastal trough with very high humidity values which in turn spawned very slow moving thunderstorms. The cost of damages from the storm were, at the time, $80 million.
On 6 August 1986, a record  of rainfall was dumped on the city in 24 hours, causing severe floods, major traffic problems and damage in many parts of the metropolitan area. 
On 3 October 1986, ten people were injured and hundreds of homes were damaged after a hail up to 6 cm size hit the western suburbs. The total damage bill was $161 million. 
On 18 March 1990, in around Auburn and Bankstown, large hail up to 8 cm diameter with strong winds and flash flooding caused $550 million worth of damage, where more than 2000 houses had window and roof damage.
With a damage cost of $670 million, the storm event damaged over 7000 houses from felled trees and floods.
On 12 February 1992, in the western and northern suburbs, a storm caused $335 million worth of damage after rain, large hail and flash flooding battered over 500 houses.
On 20 November 1994, a severe storm caused $29 million worth of damage in the Sydney region, namely in the north, where many trees were felled and houses wrecked.
In the early hours of 30 August 1996, an east coast low ravaged Sydney, bringing destructive winds that damaged properties and heavy rainfall that caused flash flooding and road blockage. Wind gusts up to 160 km/h were recorded. Insurance payouts due to the storm were estimated to be up to $50 million. 

The 14 April 1999 hailstorm was a notable storm event in Sydney, which caused severe damage in many suburbs and killed one man when his boat was struck by lightning.

21st century

2000s–2010s
On 3 December 2001, the state of New South Wales recorded a wind gust of 174 km/h during a freak thunderstorm in Richmond. In addition, two schoolchildren were killed after a tree fell on their tent in the northern suburbs.
On 8 January 2003, a powerful southerly buster brought a maximum wind gust of 109 km/h, as well as a lightning storm with small hail that caused blackouts in over 70 suburbs.
Between 1 and 2 February 2005, a powerful East Coast Low caused flash flooding in Sydney with reports of 6 cm size hail, in addition to roofs being blown off in Gladesville.
On 9 December 2007, a powerful thunderstorm affected western Sydney with hail 7 cm in diameter. The State Emergency Service received over 6000 calls for assistance and the damage bill was $201 million.
In the first weeks of the month, some suburbs were hit by thunderstorms which brought heavy rain and gusty winds which cut out power and damaged homes. The heavy rain was caused by remnants of ex-tropical Cyclone Olga and humid north-easterly winds feeding into the low pressure trough. 2010 was an overly wet year with the cloudiest October and the third cloudiest July on record. 
In 2011, Sydney recorded its wettest July since 1950. The CBD recorded  of rain that month. 2011 was also the wettest year since records began in 1858.
On 18 November 2013, an EF1 tornado hit Hornsby, a suburb in the Upper North Shore, where winds reached . Blowing off roofs and toppling large trees, the tornado injured a total of 12 people.
On 15 October 2014, a rainstorm described as a "once-in-a-decade event" hit the Sydney region. Parts of Sydney received the heaviest amount of rain in a span of hours in decades.  of rain fell in Strathfield in just over three hours. The winds were cyclonic in nature, with Sydney Airport having over  gusts, reaching Category 1 strength. This event happened due to the formation of an east coast low, which ignited several other low pressure systems.

On 20 April 2015, Sydney recorded  of rainfall, the most in any day since February 2002. Winds were "cyclonic" in nature, reaching . Killing three people, this east coast low was formed with "a really pronounced upper level trough of cold air that had moved in from Victoria", Mr Sharpe said. The maximum temperature was only , making it the coldest April day since 1983, according to BOM. 
On 16 December 2015, a tornado with a windspeed of 213 km/h tore along Sydney's southern coast, where it ripped off roofs, destroyed homes and overturned trucks. Kurnell and Bondi Junction were the most hard hit.
The deluge led to flash floods across the city and caused coastal erosion, in addition to five deaths being reported. Meanwhile, Pennant Hills, Sydney Airport and Prospect Reservoir experienced their wettest June day since 1991.
The heavy deluge caused flash flooding, submerging cars in the suburb of Redfern, alongside wind gusts that peaked over 90 km/h, which brought down trees and also contributed to the deaths of two people. In Mosman on the North Shore  of rain fell by 9am, making it the wettest spot in Sydney that day.
On 9 January 2019, Sydney was hit by a lightning storm that was "one of the biggest in recent years", where several houses were stuck. Blacktown was the worst affected by the lightning storm, with over 20 homes reporting roof damage.
On 8 February 2019, intense thunderstorms, lightning and heavy rain caused significant damage to buildings, severe road flooding, which left 45,000 homes across Sydney without power. About  fell in some inland suburbs in a span of just 30 minutes. Such heavy rainfall in a short period of time is expected once every ten years in the metropolitan area.

2020s–present

Between 7 and 9 February 2020, the Sydney metropolitan area received its heaviest rain in 30 years. The storm brought vast flooding and strong winds that caused commuter chaos and left over 100,000 homes without power. Thousands of people living in depressed areas, such as those in Narrabeen and southwest of Sydney near Georges River, were told to evacuate due to billowing floodwaters and rising river levels. At least 200 people were rescued by emergency services during the stormy weekend. Warragamba Dam, which was only at 42% in capacity, reached as close to 70% after the deluge.
In the late evening of 18 February 2020, over 60,000 lightning strikes hit the Sydney area, with wind gusts over  being recorded in some Sydney suburbs. In addition to a man being killed by a flying gas cylinder in The Rocks, the storm toppled trees, damaged properties and left tens of thousands of homes without power.
In Chester Hill, a tornado damaged homes and toppled trees, leaving thousands without electricity. Parramatta received enough rain to flood the site of the new Parramatta Powerhouse and as well as the Parramatta ferry wharf, which was overflowed after Parramatta River broke its banks. Moreover, the Warragamba Dam began to spill, which was the first significant overflow of the reservoir since 1990. Because of rising floodwaters, Nepean River and Hawkesbury River were overflowed, with areas in the suburbs nearby such as Richmond, Windsor and Penrith being evacuated. The BOM had confirmed that flooding from Hawkesbury River was higher than a similar major flooding event in November 1961.
On 19 December 2021, a storm with extreme winds of 130 km/h quickly swept across multiple suburbs in the Northern Beaches area. The storm caused a large amount of damage to property and powerlines, mostly due to trees toppling over from the wind, around 36,000 homes were left without power. In Narrabeen, three people were struck by a tree in a parking lot, causing the death of one woman and leaving two others critically injured. Volunteers from NSW SES worked alongside Fire and Rescue New South Wales and New South Wales Rural Fire Service to cleanup the damage left behind by the storm.
On 22 February 2022, a month's worth of rain fell in less than a few hours in parts of the Sydney metropolitan area, which submerged streets and businesses, damaged road pavements and felled trees, in addition to flooding the Parramatta River and the nearby Powerhouse Museum site. Many suburbs recorded rainfall up to 100mm in the day, with 110mm falling in Marrickville (98mm of it in just two hours). The 30-hour rainy event made Sydney have its wettest summer in 30 years (or since 1991/92).
On 3–8 March 2022, thousands of people in parts of western Sydney were told to evacuate as the Hawkesbury River, Nepean River and Georges rivers began to rise after 174mm of rain fell over in Warragamba in less than 24 hours on the 3rd. There was major flooding in North Richmond and Windsor as the rising river waters submerged many parts of these rural suburbs. On the 8th, a heavy deluge inundated streets in parts of southwestern Sydney and far western Sydney, killing two people in a car. Areas near the Georges River and Manly Dam were placed under an evacuation order by the State Emergency Service as floodwaters began to rise that day. On this day, Mona Vale recorded  in just two hours and Mosman received  in the six hours until the afternoon.
On 6–7 April 2022, after two days of heavy rain, residents in Woronora, Camden, Wallacia and Chipping Norton were issued with a flood evacuation order as the Woronora, Nepean and Georges Rivers began to rise. There were 25 flood rescues during the 24 hours of this event, with one death in Cobbitty.
Between 3–5 July 2022, an east coast low brought around eight months of rain in four days in Sydney's southwest, causing major flood and evacuation orders, in addition to one death. Camden, in Sydney's southwest, had received  of rain between July 2 and 3, with Sydney CBD accumulating  over the span of four days.
On 18 February 2023, a severe windstorm ripped through the city that left over 60,000 people without power. In addition to that, the heavy winds felled trees in the metropolitan area and caused chaos at a sailing tournament where a boat's large sail was cast into the air, causing minor injuries among bystanders.

Statistics
Since the records began, there have been 58 severe storms in the city, with over 47 people been killed thus far in the aforementioned severe storm events. The list showcases the months where recorded storms events have been the most frequent in:

Climate

Despite its susceptibility to heavy rainfall events, Sydney is fairly sunny, receiving around 109 clear days and 2635 hours of sunshine, annually. Even in its months of highest rainfall Sydney has relatively few rainy days, with less than 8 wet days per month on average, on the  threshold, with fewer rain days and precipitation amount recorded inland.

See also
Severe storms in Australia
Southerly buster
Climate of Sydney
Black nor'easter
East coast low

References

Sydney
Geography of Sydney
History of Sydney
Storms
Weather events in Australia